Eryxia baikiei is a species of leaf beetle of Mali and Senegal. It was first described by Joseph Sugar Baly in 1865, based on an unstated number of specimens sent to him by Scottish explorer and naturalist William Balfour Baikie, who had collected the species from the banks of the Niger River.

References

Eumolpinae
Beetles of Africa
Taxa named by Joseph Sugar Baly
Beetles described in 1865
Insects of West Africa